There have been two baronetcies created for persons with the surname Meredyth, both in the Baronetage of Ireland. Both are extinct.

The Meredyth Baronetcy, of Greenhills in County Kildare, was created in the Baronetage of Ireland on 20 November 1660 for William Meredyth, son of Sir Robert Meredyth, Chancellor of the Exchequer of Ireland. The title became extinct on the death of the twelfth Baronet in 1933.

The Meredyth Baronetcy, of Carlandstown in County Meath, was created in the Baronetage of Ireland on 26 July 1795 for John Meredyth, son of Thomas Meredyth and Alicia Tisdall, daughter of Philip Tisdall, Attorney General for Ireland and his wife Mary Singleton. He was High Sheriff of Meath for 1783 and knighted the same year. The fourth baronet was High Sheriff of Meath in 1836. The fifth Baronet was High Sheriff of County Kilkenny for 1888; the title became extinct on his death in 1923.

Meredyth baronets, of Greenhills, Co Kildare (1660)
 Sir William Meredyth, 1st Baronet ( – 14 February 1665)
 Sir Richard Meredyth, 2nd Baronet (1657 – 8 October 1743)
 Sir Robert Meredyth, 3rd Baronet ( – 18 February 1747)
 Sir Richard Meredyth, 4th Baronet (January 1733 – 1777)
 Sir Paul Meredyth, 5th Baronet (–1783)
 Sir Moore Meredyth, 6th Baronet ( – 8 November 1789)
 Sir Barry Colles Meredyth, 7th Baronet ( – 14 October 1813)
 Sir Joshua Colles Meredyth, 8th Baronet (1 June 1771 – 27 July 1850)
 Sir Edward Newenham Meredyth, 9th Baronet (1 May 1776 – 23 March 1865)
 Sir Edward Henry John Meredyth, 10th Baronet (29 May 1828 – 8 October 1904)
 Sir George Augustus Jervis Meredyth, 11th Baronet (11 Dec 1832 – 16 May 1907)
 Sir Charles George, 12th Baronet (4 July 1856 – 1933).

Meredyth baronets, of Carlandstown, County Meath (1795)
 Sir John Meredyth, 1st Baronet (late 1740 – 27 October 1799)
 Sir Thomas Meredyth, 2nd Baronet (July 1770 – )
 Sir Henry Meredyth, 3rd Baronet (June 1775 – 2 May 1859)
 Sir Henry Meredyth, 4th Baronet (1802 – 4 August 1889)
 Sir Henry Bayly Meredyth, 5th Baronet (14 January 1863 – 30 September 1923) baronetcy extinct on his death.
Millicent Valla (b. 1898) first married in 1919 Major the Hon. Herbrand Charles Alexander, D.S.O, formerly 5th Lancers, who obtained a divorce in 1927. She later married Richard Allan.

See also

 Meredith baronets

References

Extinct baronetcies in the Baronetage of Ireland
 *